William James Ahern (October 9, 1896 - May 16, 1983), was a vaudeville entertainer at the beginning of the 20th century. He is best known for being part of a comedy duo with his wife, Gladys Reese Ahern. As part of their act, Ahern told jokes and performed rope tricks while his wife, using a Mexican accent, sang and danced.

Early life
William James Ahern was born in Waterbury, Connecticut on October 9, 1896. Ahern reportedly ran off with Buffalo Bill's Wild West troupe in 1909 after a local appearance, and learned rope spinning while working with the show.

Performing career
Ahern's first performance was in 1913 at the Lyric Theater in Bridgeport, Connecticut. He did a comedic act featuring rope spinning. He subsequently worked in circuses and the Oklahoma Ranch and 101 Ranch shows doing trick riding and roping. He joined the Navy during World War I and performed in shows for Liberty Loan drives.

After World War I, Ahern and his partner, Joe O'Hare, performed a mind-reading act aboard the George Washington, a ship carrying U.S. delegates to Europe for the peace conference. After splitting up, Ahern performed solo until he met Gladys Reese in Chicago in 1919 and they formed an act. The Aherns' act consisted of Gladys dancing inside the open lasso Will twirled, as well as comedic song and dance numbers they performed together, in and out of the rope.

The Aherns spoke German, French, Italian, and Spanish, and performed for many years in Europe after American vaudeville became less popular, including appearances for soldiers during World War II. They also appeared in RKO studio shorts in the 1930s.

Will had an uncredited bit part in Hello Dolly dancing with Barbra Streisand.

For many years the Aherns operated Rainbow Studios, a rehearsal space one block North of Hollywood and Vine in Hollywood, California. Will was also active as a member and an officer in the Hollywood Comedy Club.

Notable stage appearances
Broadway appearances

 October 3, 1927 - January 7, 1928 - Sidewalks of New York, roles: Goofy, Willie
 February 18, 1930 - June 14, 1930 - Simple Simon, role: Jack Horner

Death
Ahern died May 16, 1983 at the age of 86.

References

1896 births
1983 deaths
Vaudeville performers